West Germany (Federal Republic of Germany) competed at the 1984 Winter Olympics in Sarajevo, Yugoslavia. The German Ice Skating Union president Wolf-Dieter Montag served as the head of mission for West Germany.

Medalists

Alpine skiing

Men

Women

Biathlon

Men

Men's 4 x 7.5 km relay

1A penalty loop of 150 metres had to be skied per missed target. 
2One minute added per missed target.

Bobsleigh

Cross-country skiing

Men

Men's 4 × 10 km relay

Women

Figure skating

Men

Women

Pairs

Ice Dancing

Ice hockey

Group A
Top two teams (shaded ones) advanced to the medal round.

West Germany 8-1 Yugoslavia
West Germany 8-5 Poland
Sweden 1-1 West Germany
USSR 6-1 West Germany
West Germany 9-4 Italy

Game for 5th Place

|}

Leading scorer

Team roster
Andreas Niederberger
Bernd Englbrecht
Dieter Hegen
Erich Kühnhackl
Ernst Höfner
Franz Reindl
Gerd Truntschka
Harold Kreis
Helmut Steiger
Ignaz Berndaner
Joachim Reil
Karl Friesen
Manfred Ahne
Manfred Wolf
Marcus Kuhl
Michael Betz
Peter Scharf
Roy Roedger
Udo Kiessling
Uli Hiemer
Head coach: Xaver Unsinn

Luge

Men

(Men's) Doubles

Women

Nordic combined 

Events:
 normal hill ski jumping (Three jumps, best two counted and shown here.)
 15 km cross-country skiing

Ski jumping

Speed skating

Men

Women

References

Official Olympic Reports
International Olympic Committee results database
 1984 Olympic Winter Games 1984, full results by sports-reference.com

Germany, West
1984
Winter Olympics